Igor Karačić (born 2 November 1988) is a Croatian handball player for Industria Kielce and the Croatian national team.

His older brother Ivan Karačić plays for Bosnia and Herzegovina while his younger brother Goran Karačić is a football goalkeeper who plays for Adanaspor.

Honours
Bosna Sarajevo
BIH Premier League: 2010–2011

Vardar
Macedonian Super League: 2012–13, 2014–15, 2015–16, 2016–17, 2017–18, 2018–19
Macedonian Cup: 2014, 2015, 2016, 2017, 2018
Macedonian Super Cup: 2017, 2018
EHF Champions League: 2016–17, 2018–19
SEHA League
Winner: 2013–14, 2016–17, 2017–18, 2018–19
Runner-up: 2012–13, 2015–16
IHF Super Globe
Third: 2017

References

External links

1988 births
Living people
Sportspeople from Mostar
Croats of Bosnia and Herzegovina
Croatian male handball players
Olympic handball players of Croatia
Handball players at the 2016 Summer Olympics
Expatriate handball players in Poland
Croatian expatriate sportspeople in Bosnia and Herzegovina
Croatian expatriate sportspeople in North Macedonia
Croatian expatriate sportspeople in Poland
RK Vardar players
Vive Kielce players
Competitors at the 2013 Mediterranean Games
Mediterranean Games silver medalists for Croatia
Mediterranean Games medalists in handball